"Mind Is the Magic" is a song performed by American singer-songwriter Michael Jackson, written along with Bryan Loren in 1989 for Siegfried & Roy's 'Beyond Belief Show' in Las Vegas. The song was released as a single in Europe on February 26, 2010, from the compilation album Mind Is the Magic: Anthem for the Las Vegas Show but was first released on Siegfried & Roy’s Dreams & Illusions in 1995.

"Mind Is the Magic" reached No. 80 in France on April 3, 2010. Jackson gave his permission for Siegfried & Roy to release this song in their German album Dreams & Illusions in 1995. The introduction from the song formed part of "The Drill" segment planned for Jackson's This Is It concerts.

Charts

Track listing

References 

2010 singles
Michael Jackson songs
1989 songs
Songs written by Michael Jackson